Paula Medín (born June 17, 1984) is a Spanish rugby sevens player. She was named in Spain's women's sevens team for the 2016 Summer Olympics. She was part of the team that won the final olympic spot for Rio.

She was also at the 2013 Rugby World Cup Sevens.

References

External links 
 

1984 births
Living people
Spain international women's rugby union players
Spain international women's rugby sevens players
Olympic rugby sevens players of Spain
Rugby sevens players at the 2016 Summer Olympics
Sportspeople from the Province of A Coruña
People from A Coruña (comarca)